Christopher Jhen-hoong Chung (born 20 June 1998) is an Australian-born Hong Kong professional footballer who is currently a free agent.

Club career
On 17 October 2020, it was revealed that Pegasus had signed Chung.

Career statistics

Club

Notes

References

External links

Living people
1998 births
Australian soccer players
Hong Kong footballers
Association football defenders
Association football midfielders
Hong Kong Premier League players
Southern District FC players
TSW Pegasus FC players
Hong Kong FC players
Hong Kong people of Australian descent